Herald Building may refer to:

the 1894 New York Herald Building on Herald Square, New York City
Herald Building (Salt Lake City)